A Dying Man's Hymn is the second studio album by Dutch progressive rock band Sky Architect  released on 6 June 2011 on Galileo Records. The album art was drawn by Mark Wilkinson.

Track listing 
Credits adapted from Spotify.

Personnel 
 Christiaan Bruin- Drums, Vocals (background), Engineer
 Tom Luchies- Guitar, Vocals
 Rik Van Honk- Synthesizer, Keyboards, Vocals (background), Engineer, Mastering, Grand Piano
 Guus Van Mierlo- Bass guitar
 Wabe Wieringa- Guitar, Producer, Engineer, Mixing

External links 
 Sky Architect official website
 Sky Architect on Myspace

Notes 

Sky Architect albums
2011 albums